Stenanthemum coronatum is a species of flowering plant in the family Rhamnaceae and is endemic to the southwest of Western Australia. It is a prostrate shrub with sparsely hairy young stems, broadly egg-shaped leaves and densely shaggy-hairy heads of tube-shaped flowers.

Description
There is a deep notch at the tip of the leaves with a sharp point on each side of the notch.

Taxonomy and naming
This species was first formally described in 1848 by Siegfried Reissek who gave it the name Cryptandra coronata in Johann Georg Christian Lehmann's Plantae Preissianae. In 1858, Reissek changed the name to Stenanthemum coronatum in the journal Linnaea. The specific epithet (coronatum) means "crowned", referring to the leaf clusters on the ends of branches.

Distribution and habitat
Stenanthemum coronatum grows in woodland on laterite ridges between Bindoon and Narrogin in the Jarrah Forest bioregion of south-western Western Australia.

References

coronatum
Rosales of Australia
Flora of Western Australia
Plants described in 1848